Giuseppe Mura (born 6 November 1943) is a retired Italian boxer who won a gold medal at the 1967 Mediterranean Games in the bantamweight category. Next year he competed at the Mexico Olympics, but was eliminated in the third round by the eventual bronze medalist Samuel Mbugua. After the Olympics he turned professional, and won a national super featherweight title in August 1975. He lost it in December 1975 and retired from boxing.

References

1943 births
Living people
Italian male boxers
Boxers at the 1968 Summer Olympics
Olympic boxers of Italy
Mediterranean Games gold medalists for Italy
Competitors at the 1967 Mediterranean Games
Mediterranean Games medalists in boxing
Bantamweight boxers